Saul and David is an oil-on-canvas painting by Rembrandt and/or his studio, now in the Mauritshuis and dated to between 1651 and 1658.

The painting depicts Saul, the king of the Israelites. He is visually touched by the harp playing. The depicted situation comes from the Bible book I Samuel 
16:14-23 and 18:8-11, in which King Saul is abandoned by the Holy Spirit, and God sends him an evil spirit. It taunts Saul, and only David's harp playing can relax him. Later David married one of Saul's daughters and he followed Saul as King of the Israelites. 

The painting was originally larger, but in the 19th century the canvas was cut into two unequal pieces – possibly to be sold as separate paintings. The pieces were later reattached to each other.

Sources
Rembrandt: The Case of Saul and David
http://www.mauritshuis.nl/nl-nl/verdiep/de-collectie/kunstwerken/saul-en-david-621/detailgegevens/

Paintings depicting David
Paintings by Rembrandt
1650s paintings
1660s paintings
Paintings in the collection of the Mauritshuis